Miss Universe Thailand (formerly known as Miss Thailand Universe) is a beauty pageant that has been held annually since 2000 to select Thailand's representative to the Miss Universe pageant. The competition is a continuation of the Miss Thailand pageant which had selected Thailand's representative to the Miss Universe pageant from 1954 up until 1999.

The current Miss Universe Thailand is Anna Sueangam-iam  who was crowned on July 30, 2022 at the True Icon Hall in Bangkok.

History
The franchise of Miss Universe in Thailand began in 1984, and was initially held by Charcthua Karnasuta – the former managing director of BBTV (a mass media company that operates Channel 7) and the former president of the Vajiravudh College Alumni Association (an organization that owns the Miss Thailand pageant). After granted the national license from the Miss Universe Organization, Charcthua designated the Miss Thailand pageant as the official competition to select Thailand's representative to the Miss Universe pageant.

Split from Miss Thailand

After Charcthua suffered paralysis in 1998, his sister Surang Prempree took over as the managing director of BBTV and Miss Universe's national license holder. Following Charcthua's step down as the president, the Vajiravudh College Alumni Association handed over the official broadcaster of the Miss Thailand pageant from Channel 7 to iTV in 2000. Consequently, Surang Prempree as the managing director of BBTV and the Miss Universe's national license holder split the pageant from the Miss Thailand pageant and established the new pageant, namely Miss Thailand Universe.

Rebranding to Miss Universe Thailand

Until 2012, under the suggestion of the Miss Universe Organization, the franchise renamed the Miss Thailand Universe title to Miss Universe Thailand. In addition, the official broadcasters of the pageant were transferred to Channel 5 in 2012 and Channel 3 in 2014, after Surang Prampree was asked to step down as the managing director of BBTV in 2012.

2019–present: Changing license holder
Until 2019, the Miss Universe franchise in Thailand was officially granted to a new national license holder with TPN Global Company Limited (formerly known as TPN 2018 Company Limited) – led by Somchai Cheewasutthanon, Piyaporn Sankosik, and Narong Lertkitsiri – for a period of 5 consecutive years, from 2019 to 2023. In addition, the official broadcaster of the pageant was transferred to PPTV in 2019. In 2020, Somchai Cheewasutthanon withdrew from the host committee and was replaced by Chanitnant Sankosik.

Editions
The following is a list of all Miss Universe Thailand editions, from its inception in 2000.

Titleholders
The following is a list of all Miss Universe Thailand titleholders, and runners-up, from its inception in 2000.

Winners by province

Gallery of winners

International placements

Current franchise 
Color keys

Miss Universe

Past Franchises 
Color keys

Miss International

Miss Earth 

From 2002 to 2012 and 2015–2016, contestant who was awarded 1st Runner-up at pageant became Thailand's representative in Miss Earth, except in 2001, Victoria Wachholz placed Top 12 at Miss Thailand Universe 2001 and 2017, Paweensuda Drouin was one of the 2nd Runners-up of Miss Universe Thailand 2017.

Miss Asean Friendship

Miss Supertalent of The World

Miss Tourism International (China-based)

Miss Tourism International (Malaysia-based)

Miss Tourism Queen International

Miss Intercontinental

Miss Tourism Queen of the Year International

Miss Tourism Metropolitan International

Miss Asia Pacific International

Miss Tourism World

Miss Globe International

See also

References

External links 
 

Miss Universe by country
Beauty pageants in Thailand
Recurring events established in 2000
2000 establishments in Thailand
Thai awards